Gloria is a 2013 Chilean-Spanish drama film directed by Sebastián Lelio. The film premiered in competition at the 63rd Berlin International Film Festival, where Paulina García won the Silver Bear for Best Actress. It was shown at the 2013 Toronto International Film Festival. The film was selected as the Chilean entry for the Best Foreign Language Film at the 86th Academy Awards, but it was not nominated. It won Best Ibero-American Film at the 1st Platino Awards. Sebastián Lelio remade Gloria in 2018 as Gloria Bell, starring Julianne Moore and John Turturro.

Plot
In Santiago, Chile, Gloria, a 58-year-old woman, decides she doesn't want to spend her days alone after 10 years of being divorced and with her children grown up. She starts attending singles discos where she meets Rodolfo, who runs an amusement park on the outskirts of the city. Despite being seven years older than Gloria and recently divorced, Rodolfo immediately begins a relationship with her. However, he remains extremely close to his two grown-up daughters who rely on him for full financial support, as neither of them has a job. Consequently, Rodolfo never turns off his mobile phone and answers it immediately if his daughters call, regardless of his location. During a date at his amusement park, the two share a kiss.

After a successful lunch with Rodolfo and her friends, Gloria introduces him to her family at a birthday dinner for her son, where her ex-husband Gabriel is also a guest. When asked about his career, Rodolfo struggles to keep up with the barrage of questions about his personal life, having served as an officer in the Chilean Navy. Following heavy drinking, Gloria becomes overly friendly with Gabriel, much to Rodolfo's discomfort. He excuses himself to answer a call from his daughter and doesn't return to the party. Furious, Gloria ends their relationship the following day. Rodolfo meets Gloria at her office to defend his actions at the party and reprimand her for her behavior.

After numerous unsuccessful attempts, Rodolfo finally convinces Gloria to go with him to a luxury hotel beside the sea in Viña del Mar. However, upon arriving in their room, one of Rodolfo's daughters calls to inform him that her mother has been in an accident and he needs to return home immediately. Despite Gloria's attempt to leave, Rodolfo stops her, saying he won't abandon their relationship. They then have sex after she strips.

That night, they head down to the hotel dining room and make plans to go on vacation as a couple. Despite Rodolfo's phone ringing continuously, he refuses to answer it. Gloria asks to see his phone and drops it into his soup, after which Rodolfo excuses himself from the table. Gloria assumes he's gone to the men's room, but he never returns. Upset, Gloria heads to the bar and drinks heavily, leading to a wild night at the casino, disco, and through the city streets. She wakes up with a terrible hangover on the beach the next morning, only to find out that Rodolfo has checked out with her belongings and the room is no longer available. She calls her cleaning lady, Victoria, to come and get her, and they return to Santiago by bus several hours later.

Upon returning home, Rodolfo repeatedly tries to contact Gloria without success. Gloria retrieves one of Rodolfo's paintball guns from her trash bin and puts it back in her car. She drives to his house and splatters the front with green paintballs before shooting Rodolfo in the groin as he tries to enter the house with groceries. His family runs out in horror and yells obscenities at Gloria, who then rushes back to her car and drives away. She then heads to a wedding she had originally planned to attend, arriving midway through the reception. Her friends express gratitude and encourage her to enjoy the party. Despite declining numerous invitations to dance, Gloria stands up when the DJ plays her theme song, Gloria by Umberto Tozzi, and takes to the dance floor, allowing herself to get lost in the music.

Cast
 Paulina García as Gloria Cumplido
 Sergio Hernández as Rodolfo Fernández
 Diego Fontecilla as Pedro
 Fabiola Zamora as Ana
 Alejandro Goic as Daniel
 Coca Guazzini as Luz
 Hugo Moraga as Hugo
 Luz Jiménez as Victoria
 Cristián Carvajal as Vecino
 Liliana García as Flavia
 Antonia Santa María as María
 Eyal Meyer as Theo
 Marcial Tagle as Marcial
 Marcela Said as Marcela
 Pablo Krögh as Pablo

Reception
The film received excellent reviews when it premiered at the 2013 Berlin International Film Festival, topping both Screen Internationals Screen jury poll of international critics, and IndieWire's critics poll of the best films screened at Berlin in 2013. On Rotten Tomatoes the film has a "Certified Fresh" approval rating of 99% based on 128 reviews, with an average rating of 7.9/10. The site's consensus is "Marvelously directed by Sebastian Lelio and beautifully led by a powerful performance from Paulina Garcia, Gloria takes an honest, sweetly poignant look at a type of character that's all too often neglected in Hollywood." On Metacritic, the film holds a score of 83 out of 100, based on reviews from 30 critics, indicating "universal acclaim".

David Rooney of The Hollywood Reporter writes "it’s hard to imagine anyone with a heart and a brain not responding to the quiet delights and stunning intimacy of Chilean director Sebastian Lelio’s account of the personal evolution of a 58-year-old divorcee, played with scrupulous honesty and intelligence by the wonderful Paulina Garcia" and "Funny, melancholy and ultimately uplifting, Sebastian Lelio's enormously satisfying spell inside the head and heart of a middle-aged woman never puts a foot wrong".

Variety writes "Perceptive and unerringly sympathetic, 'Gloria' has the makings of an arthouse sleeper".

Mark Adams of Screen International writes "A delightfully astute and compassionate delve into the life of a 58 year-old divorcee looking for company, romance and perhaps even love, director Sebastián Lelio’s engaging, amusing and oddly uplifting Gloria is a film that will strike a chord with audiences of a certain age. It is driven by a quite wonderful performance from Paulina Garcia, who should snag best actress awards at every festival the film plays at."

Eric Kohn of IndieWire gave the film an A and describes it as a "breakthrough" for actress Paulina Garcia.

Awards

See also
 List of submissions to the 86th Academy Awards for Best Foreign Language Film
 List of Chilean submissions for the Academy Award for Best Foreign Language Film
 Cinema of Chile

References

External links
 
 
 

2013 films
2013 drama films
2010s Spanish-language films
Chilean drama films
Spanish drama films
Films directed by Sebastián Lelio
Roadside Attractions films
2010s Spanish films
2010s Chilean films